John Tillson (October 25, 1825 – August 6, 1892) was an American lawyer, newspaper editor, and politician.

Born in Hillsboro, Illinois, Tillson went to Hillsboro Academy and Illinois College. In 1847, Tillson received his law degree from the Transylvania Law School and was admitted to the Illinois bar in Quincy, Illinois. He practiced law in Quincy, Illinois. During the American Civil War, Tillson served in the 10th Illinois Volunteer Infantry Regiment and was commissioned colonel. In 1869 and 1870, Tillson was the editor of the Quincy Whig newspaper. Tillson served on the Quincy City Council from 1867 to 1871 In 1873, Tillson was elected to the Illinois House of Representatives, as a Republican, succeeding Nehemiah Bushnell who died in office. In June 1873, Tillson resigned from the Illinois General Assembly when he was appointed Internal Revenue Collector serving until 1881. Tillson died at his home in Quincy, Illinois.

Notes

External links

1825 births
1892 deaths
People from Hillsboro, Illinois
People from Quincy, Illinois
People of Illinois in the American Civil War
Illinois College alumni
Transylvania University alumni
Editors of Illinois newspapers
Illinois lawyers
Illinois city council members
Republican Party members of the Illinois House of Representatives
Union Army colonels
19th-century American politicians
19th-century American lawyers